The 2019 Teignbridge District Council election took place on 2 May 2019 to elect members of Teignbridge District Council in England. At the election, the Liberal Democrats won control of the council.

Summary

Election result

|-

Ward Results
Incumbents are denoted by an asterisk (*).

Ambrook

Ashburton & Buckfastleigh

Bishopsteignton

Bovey

Bradley

Buckland & Milber

Bushell

Chudleigh

College

Dawlish North East

Dawlish South West

Haytor

Ipplepen

Kenn Valley

Kenton & Starcross

Kerswell-with-Combe

Kingsteignton East

Kingsteignton West

Moretonhampstead

Shaldon & Stokeinteignhead

Teign Valley

Teignmouth Central

Teignmouth East

Teignmouth West

Notes

References 

Teignbridge District Council elections
2019 English local elections
May 2019 events in the United Kingdom
2010s in Devon